Six-Gun Rhythm is a 1939 American Western film directed by Sam Newfield.

Cast 
Tex Fletcher as Tex Fletcher
Joan Barclay as Jean Harper
Ralph Peters as Spud Donovan
Reed Howes as Jim Davis
Malcolm 'Bud' McTaggart as Don Harper
Ted Adams as Sheriff Joe
Walter Shumway as Henchman Bart
Kit Guard as Henchman Pat
Carl Mathews as Henchman Jake
Art Davis as Henchman Mike
Robert Frazer as Lem Baker
Jack McHugh as Teammate Butch
James Sheridan as Henchman Slim

Soundtrack 
 Tex Fletcher - "There's a Cabin in the Valley" (Written by Johnny Lange and Lew Porter)
 Tex Fletcher - "When I Get Back on the Range" (Written by Johnny Lange and Lew Porter)
 Tex Fletcher - "They Won't Stretch My Neck if I Know It" (Written by Johnny Lange and Lew Porter)
 "Serenade to a Lovely Senorita" (Johnny Lange and Lew Porter)
 Tex Fletcher - "Git Along Little Doggies" (Traditional)
 Tex Fletcher - "Lonesome Cowboy" (Written by Johnny Lange and Lew Porter)

External links 

1939 films
1930s English-language films
American black-and-white films
1939 Western (genre) films
Grand National Films films
American Western (genre) films
Films directed by Sam Newfield
1930s American films